Ultraelectromagneticpop! (stylized as ultraelectromagneticpop!) is the debut studio album of the Filipino rock band, Eraserheads. It was released by BMG Records (Pilipinas) Inc. in  July 1993. Ultraelectromagneticpop! spawned hit songs such as "Ligaya", "Toyang", and "Pare Ko". The album is often credited for revitalizing the alternative rock genre in the Philippines during the 1990s.

Background
Though Ultraelectromagneticpop! was their debut album, most of the songs were recycled from original compositions that were written since their college days in 1989. Hoping to have their songs published, the band recorded a demo tape in 1991 and shopped around record labels and radio stations, only to be rejected at every turn. A friend-professor, Robin Rivera, from their school, UP Diliman, helped them record an improved version of the demo tape which was named Pop U!, a play on the invective "fuck you," in response to the people who turned them down. After a year of being passed around the underground music scene, the demo tape made its way to the hands of BMG Records (Pilipinas), Inc., who signed a three-year contract with the band.

The title of the album is a pun on ultraelectromagnetic tops, a fictional weapon from the anime serial Voltes V, which was immensely popular in the Philippines.

Recording
Recordings of Ultraelectromagneticpop! started in July 1992 until April 1993, at JR Recording Studio and Ad & Ad Recording Studio. For production duties, the Eraserheads worked with Ed Formoso. The group found it hard to record the album due to multiple reasons, such as the master recording machine kept breaking, brownouts, and other factors. Midway through a session, Formoso abruptly left the studio for undisclosed reasons. This decision made the band furious, and prompted them to insert a backmasked message ("Ed Formoso sucks!") onto the last track of the album, "Combo on the Run".

Due to Formoso's departure, the Eraserheads were forced to produce the other songs intended for the record.

Release
The album was released by BMG Records ( Pilipinas ) under the label's local division, Musiko Records in July 1993. The album was originally issued on both compact disc and cassette tape formats with the respective catalog numbers: MRCD-032 and MRMC-032. Original issue cassettes featured full-color sticker labels on both sides.

In 2008, the album was re-released together with the band's other albums.

25th anniversary remastered version
Coinciding with the album's 25th anniversary, a remastered edition of Ultraelectromagneticpop was released on November 21, 2018, under Sony Music Philippines and Offshore Music. Ely Buendia made the first announcement on his Instagram and Facebook accounts. The album was remastered by Grammy award-winning American audio engineer Bernie Grundman. In January 2019, Buendia revealed through his independent record label, Offshore Music, along with Sony Music, that the master tapes of the Eraserheads' first album, Ultraelectromagneticpop!, are currently being archived by the University of the Philippines Center for Ethnomusicology for the album's cultural significance.

Track listing

On the 2018 remastered edition, "Walang Hiyang Pare Ko" is excluded from the track listing.

Personnel

Credits for Ultraelectromagneticpop! adapted from liner notes. Track numbers noted in parenthesis below are based on track numbering.

 Ely Buendia – lead vocals, rhythm guitar, acoustic guitar (4), lead guitar (6)
 Buddy Zabala – bass guitar, backing vocals, acoustic guitar (4)
 Marcus Adoro – lead guitar, backing vocals, hand claps (4), tambourine (8), lead vocals (9)
 Raimund Marasigan – drums, backing vocals, melodica (2), tambourine (4), hand claps (4), lead guitar (6), piano (10)

Additional personnel

 Dem – production (2, 5, 6, 9, 10, 12)
 Ed Formoso – producer (1, 3–4, 7–8, 11)
 Willie Munji – mixer, recording
 Jojo Bacasmas – lead vocals (5), backing vocals (6–7)
 Maryana Arinez – saxophone (3)
 Boy Tanquinitic – recording
 Jhoffer Aquino – recording
 Ronnie Soriano – recording
 Annie Angala – management
 Buddy Medina – executive producer
 Rudy Tee – executive producer
 Dodong Viray – production coordinator
 Vic Valenciano – artists and repertoire
 Mario Joson – art direction, design
 Chitty Ramirez – art execution
 Mitch Amurao – photography

Legacy
The release of Ultraelectromagneticpop! gave way to other Filipino bands to splash onto the Philippine Alternative Music Scene and also saw the emergence of the so-called "90's Rock Revolution" in the Philippines.

The album name inspired the tribute album Ultraelectromagneticjam!: The Music of the Eraserheads, which featured covers and arrangements of 17 of Eraserheads' most popular songs.

Notes

References

External links
Allmusic Review
schizo-archives.com
ultraelectromagneticpop! Cassette Inlay

1993 debut albums
Eraserheads albums